Balabekh Karapet (18?? - 1915 in Bitlis) (known as Big Mustache Balapekh) was an Armenian fedayi in Western Armenia and a member of Dashnaks (Dashnaktsutyun) and the bodyguard of Aghbiur Serob. He was arrested and executed during the eve of the Armenian genocide.

References

Date of birth unknown
1915 deaths
Armenian nationalists
Armenian fedayi